Antonio Marasco (born 19 February 1970) is an Italian former professional footballer. From 2007, he played as a midfielder in Serie D, the fifth highest level in Italian football and the level right below the professional league.

Career
Born in Torre Annunziata, the Province of Naples, Campania, Marasco started his career at hometown club Savoia of Serie D. He won the Group M champions and promoted to Serie C2 in 1990. In 1991, he left for Serie B side Avellino (which also located in Campania) and followed the team relegated in 1992. He followed the team promoted back to Serie B in 1995. In 1996, he returned to Savoia at Serie C1.

In October 1997, he left for Serie B side Reggiana. In October 1998, he left for Serie B side Hellas Verona along with Stefano Guidoni. He won Serie B champion and made his Serie A debut in 1999–2000 season.

In the 2000–01 season, he left for Serie B side Venezia, which won promotion to Serie A in June 2001.

In August 2002, after Venezia's owner Maurizio Zamparini purchased Serie B team Palermo, he followed his teammates Di Napoli, Kewullay Conteh, Mario Santana, Igor Budan, Stefano Morrone and Daniel Andersson, etc. transferred to the Sicily side.

In January 2003, he left for Serie A team Modena.

Match-fixing & Serie D
He was involved in match-fixing and banned for three years in 2004. Stefano Bettarini, Roberto D'Aversa, Generoso Rossi, Maurizio Caccavale and Alfredo Femiano were also banned.

In January 2006, he returned to football, for non-professional (Serie D) side Savoia. In the 2006–07 season, he left for Scafatese, also from Campania and at Serie D. In the 2006–07 season, he briefly played for Serie C2 side Neapolis Mugnano (which located in Naples, Campania) and then left for another hometown club Aversa Normanna of Serie D.

In the 2008–09 season, he was the captain of Serie D side Pianura, which located in Pianura, suburb of Naples.

References

External links

1970 births
A.C. Reggiana 1919 players
U.S. Avellino 1912 players
Association football midfielders
Venezia F.C. players
Hellas Verona F.C. players
Italian footballers
Living people
Modena F.C. players
People from Torre Annunziata
Serie A players
Serie B players
Palermo F.C. players
S.F. Aversa Normanna players
S.S. Scafatese Calcio 1922 players
Sportspeople from the Province of Naples
Footballers from Campania